Parnara bada, the African straight swift, grey swift or Ceylon swift, is a butterfly of the family Hesperiidae. It is found in south-east Asia, from India through China to Indonesia, as well as the north-east coast of Australia.

Description

The wingspan is about 30 mm.

The larvae feed on Leersia hexandra, Oryza sativa, Saccharum officinarum and Bambusa. It creates a shelter made from leaves joined with silk. It hides in this shelter during the day and emerges at night to feed. Pupation takes place inside this shelter.

References

External links
Australian Insects
Australian Faunal Directory

Hesperiinae